Ponoka  is a town in central Alberta, Canada.

The name Ponoka is Blackfoot for "elk", which is the animal depicted in the town flag. Ponoka County's municipal office is located in Ponoka.

History 
Ponoka (meaning elk in Blackfoot) is in a territory that was occupied and stewarded by the Cree people for thousands of years.    The colonial settler town of Ponoka originated in 1891 as a waypoint for the railway from Edmonton to Calgary; the town was formally incorporated in 1904.

Demographics 

In the 2016 Census of Population conducted by Statistics Canada, the Town of Ponoka recorded a population of 7,229 living in 3,010 of its 3,301 total private dwellings, a  change from its 2011 population of 6,778.

Economy 
Industries are agriculture (grain and cattle production) and oil and gas production.

Arts and culture 
Ponoka is home to the Ponoka Stampede, a seven-day rodeo held at the end of June or beginning of July, usually coinciding with the Canada Day long weekend. This annual event is part of the Canadian Professional Rodeo Association's professional tour, and features a midway and other activities.

Attractions 
The Wolf Creek Trail starts at the southern end of Ponoka near the Ponoka Community Golf Course and travels northwards along the Battle River for several kilometres. Informational signs are posted along the trail featuring descriptions of various local wild animals and historical facts. Several baseball diamonds, benches and picnic tables are also located along the trail.

Lions Centennial Park is a major park located along the west side of Highway 2A. It features a pond with a dock, several bathroom facilities, a stage, "The World's Largest Bucking Saddle Bronc and Rider", the Centennial Time Capsule, several gazebos with picnic tables and the Fort Ostell Museum, as well as a splash park.

Notable people 
 Jim Butterfield, computing author
 Marcel Comeau, ice hockey coach and National Hockey League team executive
 Harry York, former professional hockey player
 Maddison Pearman, Olympic long track speed skater

Infrastructure 
Health care facilities in Ponoka include the Ponoka Hospital and Care Centre, the Centennial Centre for Mental Health and Brain Injury, the Northcott Care Centre, and the Rimoka Housing Facility. The Ponoka Hospital and Care Centre is responsible for general health care, while the Centennial Centre serves as a care and treatment facility for mental health and is known for its brain injury program (the Halvar Jonson Centre for Brain Injury). The Northcott Care Centre, Rimoka Housing Facility and Seasons Retirement Community all care for the elderly, with the Northcott Care Centre focusing on care for people with disabilities and Seasons providing supportive living care.

Services 
Fire service is provided by the Ponoka County Volunteer Fire Department. Policing is the responsibility of the Ponoka Royal Canadian Mounted Police (RCMP) Detachment. General bylaw enforcement is undertaken by the town's special constable in collaboration with the RCMP.

See also 
List of communities in Alberta
List of towns in Alberta

References

External links 

 
1891 establishments in Alberta
1900 establishments in the Northwest Territories
Towns in Alberta